Patricia Clarkson is an American actress who has received numerous accolades since beginning her acting career in 1987, including one Academy Award nomination, two Golden Globe nominations, three Primetime Emmys, one British Independent Film Award, one Tony Award nomination, and five Screen Actors Guild Award nominations.

Clarkson garnered critical acclaim for her performance in High Art (1998), which earned her an Independent Spirit Award nomination, among other critical accolades. Her subsequent performance in The Green Mile (1999) earned her a Saturn Award for Best Supporting Actress. In 2003, she starred in three films which received numerous accolades: The Station Agent, for which she was nominated for two Screen Actors Guild Awards, and won the Special Jury Prize at the Sundance Film Festival; All the Real Girls, for which she also won the Special Jury Prize at Sundance; and Pieces of April, for which she was nominated for the Academy Award for Best Supporting Actress and the Golden Globe for Best Supporting Actress, as well as receiving a Satellite Award for Best Supporting Actress.

On television, Clarkson earned two Primetime Emmy Awards for Outstanding Guest Actress in a Drama Series for her performance on Six Feet Under, in 2002 and 2006, respectively. 2014 saw Clarkson nominated for a Tony Award for Best Featured Actress in a Play for her performance on Broadway in The Elephant Man (2014). In 2017, she won a British Independent Film Award for Best Supporting Actress for her performance in Sally Potter's The Party, and in 2018, she received her second Golden Globe nomination for her work on the miniseries Sharp Objects (2018).

Academy Awards
The Academy Awards are a set of awards given by the Academy of Motion Picture Arts and Sciences annually for excellence of cinematic achievements.

British Independent Film Awards
The British Independent Film Awards (BIFA) is an organization that celebrates, supports, and promotes British independent cinema and filmmakers in the United Kingdom.

Deauville American Film Festival
The Deauville American Film Festival is a yearly film festival devoted to American cinema, taking place since 1975 in Deauville, France.

Golden Globe Awards
The Golden Globe Award is an accolade bestowed by the 93 members of the Hollywood Foreign Press Association (HFPA) recognizing excellence in film and television, both domestic and foreign.

Gotham Awards
The Gotham Awards are presented by the Independent Filmmaker Project (IFP) to showcase and honor independent films of the United States.

Independent Spirit Awards
The Independent Spirit Awards are presented annually by Film Independent, awarding the best works in the independent film community.

Primetime Emmy Awards
The Primetime Emmy Awards are bestowed by the Academy of Television Arts & Sciences (ATAS) in recognition of excellence in American primetime television programming.

Satellite Awards
The Satellite Awards are a set of annual awards given by the International Press Academy.

Saturn Awards
The Saturn Awards are presented annually by the Academy of Science Fiction, Fantasy, and Horror Films to honor science fiction, fantasy, and horror films, television, and home video.

Screen Actors Guild Awards
The Screen Actors Guild Awards are organized by the Screen Actors Guild‐American Federation of Television and Radio Artists. First awarded in 1995, the awards aim to recognize excellent achievements in film and television.

Sundance Film Festival
The Sundance Film Festival is the largest film festival held annually in United States, in Park City, Utah.

Tony Awards
The Antoinette Perry Award (Tony) is presented by the American Theatre Wing and The Broadway League. Considered the highest honor in U.S. theater, they are the theater equivalent to the Oscars and the Emmys.

Critics' awards

References

Sources

Lists of awards received by American actor